A virapulla is a traditional Swedish gaming container with dishes and jettons designed for playing the national game of Vira, but also used for other games.

Description 
A virapulla container may be made of plastic, china or metal. The counters are based on the old French system with circular, short and long rectangular pieces known in French as jetons, fiches and contrats. There are individual dishes for the players and the container has a reversible lid for the common pool. The name is derived from the game of Vira and the French word poulan which means "gaming dish". The French influence may be because Vira was derived from the then French games of Ombre and Boston. The game was invented in the 19th century and the virapulla in the early 20th century.

References 

Swedish card games
Card game equipment
Gaming devices